Luigi Numa Lorenzo Einaudi  (24 March 1874 – 30 October 1961) was an Italian politician and economist. He served as the president of Italy from 1948 to 1955.

Early life
Einaudi was born to Lorenzo and Placida Fracchia in Carrù, in the province of Cuneo, Piedmont. In Turin he attended Liceo classico Cavour and completed his university studies; in the same years he became acquainted with socialist ideas and collaborated with the magazine Critica sociale, directed by the socialist leader Filippo Turati. In 1895, after overcoming financial difficulties, he graduated in jurisprudence, and was later appointed as professor in the University of Turin, the Polytechnic University of Turin and the Bocconi University of Milan.

As an economist Einaudi belonged to the classical school of economics in addition to Pietro Campilli, Epicarmo Corbino and Gustavo Del Vecchio.

Early political life

From the early 20th century, Einaudi moved increasingly towards a more conservative stance. In 1919 he was named Senator of the Kingdom of Italy. He also worked as a journalist for important Italian newspapers such as La Stampa and Il Corriere della Sera, as well as being financial correspondent for The Economist. An anti-fascist, he stopped working for Italian newspapers from 1926, under the Fascist regime, resuming his professional relationship with the Corriere della Sera after the fall of the regime in 1943. After the Armistice (8 September 1943) he fled to Switzerland, returning to Italy in 1944.

Einaudi was Governor of the Bank of Italy from 5 January 1945 until 11 May 1948, and was also a founding member of the Consulta Nazionale which opened the way to the new Parliament of the Italian Republic after World War II. Later he was Minister of Finances, Treasury and Balance, as well as Vice-Premier, in 1947–48. He was also a member of the neo-liberal think tank the Mont Pelerin Society.

Einaudi was elected an International Honorary Member of the American Academy of Arts and Sciences in 1935 and an International Member of the American Philosophical Society in 1947.

President (1948–1955)

On 11 May 1948 he was elected the second President of the Italian Republic. At the end of the seven-year term of office in 1955 he became Life Senator. Einaudi was a member of numerous cultural, economic and university institutions. He was a supporter of the ideal of European Federalism.

Einaudi personally managed the activities of his farm near Dogliani, producing Nebbiolo wine, for which he boasted to be using the most advanced agricultural developments. In 1950, monarchist satirical magazine Candido published a cartoon in which Einaudi is at the Quirinal Palace, surrounded by a presidential guard of honour (the corazzieri) of giant bottles of Nebbiolo wine, each labeled with the institutional logo. The cartoon was judged a lèse-majesté by a court of the time, and Giovannino Guareschi, as the director of the magazine, was held responsible and sentenced.

Personal life 
Einaudi married Countess Ida Pellegrini (1885-1968) on 19 December 1903. Pellegrini was born in Pescantina in 1885 into a family of the Veronese aristocracy, as she was the daughter of Count Giulio Pellegrini. She attended the Regia School of Commerce in Turin, where she met her future husband, who was her professor at the time. Their son Giulio became a prominent Italian publisher, and their grandson Ludovico a neo-Classical musician.

Their son Mario was a Cornell University professor and active anti-fascist. The Mario Einaudi Center for International Studies is named after him. Additionally, Mario founded the Fondazione Luigi Einaudi in Turin in honor of his father.

The Einaudi Institute for Economics and Finance (EIEF), a research center of the Bank of Italy, is named after Luigi Einaudi.

Einaudi died in Rome on 30 October, 1961 at the age of 87.

Bibliography
Principi di scienza delle finanze (1932) 
Il buon governo (1954)
Prediche inutili (1956–1959)
Tracotanze protezionistiche (1919)
Via il Prefetto! (1944)
On Abstract and Historical Hypotheses and on Value Judgments in Economic Sciences, Critical Edition with an Introduction and Afterword by Paolo Silvestri. 'Routledge Studies in the History of Economics, Vol 185', New York-London, 2017, .

References

Sources
 Acocella, N. (ed.), "Luigi Einaudi: studioso, statista, governatore", Carocci, Roma, 2010, .
 Forte, F. and Marchionatti, R. (2011). Luigi Einaudi's economics of liberalism. The European Journal of the History of Economic Thought, September 1–38.
 Giordano, A. (2004), Luigi Einaudi and the Dilemmas of Liberal Democracy, Notizie di Politeia, XX, 2004, n. 75, pp. 7–12 (http://www-4.unipv.it/paviagc/?page_id=236).
 Silvestri, Paolo The ideal of good government in Luigi Einaudi's Thought and Life: Between Law and Freedom, in Paolo Heritier, Paolo Silvestri (Eds.), Good government, Governance, Human complexity. Luigi Einaudi's legacy and contemporary societies, Leo Olschki, Firenze, 2012, pp. 55–95. 
 Silvestri, Paolo, "Preface", in L. Einaudi, On Abstract and Historical Hypotheses and on Value judgments in Economic Sciences, Routledge, London – New York, 2017, pp. XXIV-XXXII.
 Silvestri, Paolo, "The defence of economic science and the issue of value judgments", in L. Einaudi, On Abstract and Historical Hypotheses and on Value judgments in Economic Sciences, Routledge, London – New York, 2017, pp. 1–34.
 Silvestri Paolo, "Freedom and taxation between good and bad polity, and the economist-whole-man", in L. Einaudi, On Abstract and Historical Hypotheses and on Value judgments in Economic Sciences, Routledge, London – New York, 2017, pp. 94–136.

External links

Biography at the Official Website of Presidency of Italian Republic 
 

|-

1874 births
1961 deaths
Bocconi University alumni
Academic staff of Bocconi University
Deputy Prime Ministers of Italy
Fellows of the Econometric Society
Finance ministers of Italy
Governors of the Bank of Italy
Grand Crosses Special Class of the Order of Merit of the Federal Republic of Germany
Historians of economic thought
Italian anti-fascists
Italian economists
Exiled Italian politicians
Italian Liberal Party politicians
Italian life senators
Knights Grand Cross with Collar of the Order of Merit of the Italian Republic
Manifesto of the Anti-Fascist Intellectuals
Members of the National Council (Italy)
Members of the Constituent Assembly of Italy
Members of the Senate of the Kingdom of Italy
People from the Province of Cuneo
Politicians of Piedmont
Presidents of Italy
Recipients of the Pour le Mérite (civil class)
University of Turin alumni
Honorary Fellows of the British Academy
Member of the Mont Pelerin Society
Members of the American Philosophical Society